Almadén de la Plata is a municipality in Seville, Spain. It had a population of 1,696 in 2005 and has population density of 6.6 people per km², with a total area of about 256 km². It is located at an altitude of 450 meters and is 59 kilometers from Seville.

References

External links
Almadén de la Plata

Municipalities of the Province of Seville